Tom J. Bordonaro Jr. (born March 22, 1959 Fullerton, California) is a former Republican California State Assemblyman who served from 1994 to 1998. He was the first wheelchair-user to be elected to the State Assembly. He left the role in 1998 after having made one unsuccessful run for Congress, in a special election against Lois Capps in early 1998 after the death of her husband Walter Capps. Bordonaro lost to Capps again in November 1998. Bordonaro is currently the San Luis Obispo County (CA) Assessor.

Born in Fullerton, California, Bordonaro graduated from California Polytechnic State University with a degree in agricultural management.

References

1959 births
Living people
Republican Party members of the California State Assembly
People from Fullerton, California
People from San Luis Obispo County, California
California Polytechnic State University alumni
American politicians with disabilities